R. A. de Courcy Lyons (1908 — 13 April 1976) was an Argentine first-class cricketer.

Lyons was born in Argentina in 1908 and was educated in England at Brighton College. Lyons made his debut in first-class cricket for Argentina against the touring Marylebone Cricket Club at in Buenos Aires at the Hurlingham Club on New Year's Eve in 1926, with Lyons playing against the MCC in two further first-class matches in the series in January 1927 at the Belgrano Athletic Club. He later made a fourth appearance in first-class cricket in March 1930 against Sir Julien Cahn's touring personal eleven at the Hurlingham Club. In four first-class matches, he scored 7 runs and took 3 wickets.

References

External links

1908 births
1976 deaths
People educated at Brighton College
Argentine cricketers